Lumberton is the name of several places:

Canada
 Lumberton, British Columbia, a ghost town

United States
 Lumberton, Florida, an unincorporated community in Pasco County, Florida
 Lumberton, Mississippi
 Lumberton, New Jersey
 Lumberton, New Mexico
 Lumberton, North Carolina
 Lumberton Commercial Historic District
 Lumberton Municipal Airport
 Lumberton, Ohio
 Lumberton, Texas

See also
 Lumberton High School (disambiguation)
 Lumberton Independent School District, Texas
 Lumberton Public School District, Mississippi
 Lumberton Township School District, New Jersey